Aly El Dawoudi (born on September 25, 1949) is a former Egyptian tennis Davis Cup player.

See also
Egyptian Tennis Federation

References

External links
 

Egyptian male tennis players
Living people
1949 births
Place of birth missing (living people)
African Games medalists in tennis
African Games gold medalists for Egypt
Competitors at the 1973 All-Africa Games
20th-century Egyptian people